Taylors Hill is a suburb in Melbourne, Victoria, Australia,  north-west of Melbourne's Central Business District, located within the City of Melton local government area.

The boundaries are Gourlay Road to the west and Taylors Road to the south, while the eastern limit aligns with Overton Lea Boulevard and the northern limit aligns Chervil Close and Hume Drive.

Taylors Hill is master planned with sporting large house blocks, parks, walking tracks, playgrounds and lakes. Taylors Hill comprises two estates; Watervale and Taylors Hill.

References

Suburbs of Melbourne
Suburbs of the City of Melton